The 35th Legislative Assembly of Ontario was in session from September 6, 1990, until April 28, 1995, just prior to the 1995 general election. The majority party was the Ontario New Democratic Party led by Bob Rae.

David William Warner served as speaker for the assembly.

Issues
In 1993, Rae's government introduced legislation known as the Social Contract which was intended to reduce expenditures on salaries paid to members of the provincial civil service without layoffs.

In 1994, the government introduced the Equality Rights Statute Amendment Act (Bill 167), intended to extend civil union rights to same-sex couples. The bill was defeated on a free vote of 68-59 on June 9, 1994.

Members

References 
Members in Parliament 35

Terms of the Legislative Assembly of Ontario
1990 establishments in Ontario
1995 disestablishments in Ontario